Diamonds is a 1937 German mystery film directed by Eduard von Borsody and starring Hansi Knoteck, Viktor Staal, and Hilde Körber.

The film's sets were designed by the art director Walter Röhrig. Location shooting took place in Amsterdam and Hamburg.

Cast

References

Bibliography

External links 
 

1937 films
1937 mystery films
Films of Nazi Germany
German mystery films
1930s German-language films
Films directed by Eduard von Borsody
German black-and-white films
UFA GmbH films
Films set in Amsterdam
Films shot in Amsterdam
1930s German films